Manuel Ferreira (22 October 1905 – 29 July 1983) was an Argentine footballer who was a member of the Argentina national team.

Ferreira was part of the Argentine squad that won the football silver medal at the 1928 Olympic tournament. He also captained the Argentine team at the 1930 FIFA World Cup finals, in which Argentina finished as runner-up.

Ferreira won the Copa América championship with Argentina in 1929 and also won the Copa Newton in 1927 and 1928.

Career
Nicknamed Nolo or Piloto Olímpico, Ferreira started his career at Club Argentino of Trenque Lauquen, then moving to Estudiantes de La Plata where he was part of the attacking formation known as Los Profesores ("the professors") along with Alejandro Scopelli, Alberto Zozaya, Miguel Ángel Lauri, and Enrique Guaita. That team lasted from 1928 to 1933, and was widely recognised due to their skills with the ball and the accuracy of their passes. They scored 103 goals in 1931 for a total of 216 within two seasons. Also in 1933, Zozaya (33) and Scopelli (31) were the top scorers of the tournament, setting a record of two players of the same team being top scorers. The nickname professors was not only due to their knowledge of the game but for the fact that the players used to enter to the pictch wearing blue blazers. Apart from that, all of them were cultured people (Ferreira, p.e., was a scrivener).

Ferreira played in Estudiantes from 1924 to 1933. He was then transferred to River Plate where he had a short tenure, returning to Estudiantes until 1936 when he retired from professional football. Ferreira scored 100 goals for Estudiantes, ranking among its 10 historical top scorers.

After his retirement, Ferreira resumed his career as scrivener, also working as sports commentator in several media including radio broadcasting and newspapers Clarín and La Plata's El Día. He was correspondent covering the FIFA World Cup, working with notable announcer Joaquín Carballo Serantes (mostly known as "Fioravanti") and former footballer Roberto Cherro. In 1955, he was coach of Estudiantes.

Ferreira died of cancer at 77 years old in a hospital in Barcelona. In 1991, a street in his hometown was named after him.

References

External links

 

1905 births
1930 FIFA World Cup players
1983 deaths
Argentine footballers
Argentine people of Portuguese descent
Estudiantes de La Plata footballers
Club Atlético River Plate footballers
Argentina international footballers
Footballers at the 1928 Summer Olympics
Olympic footballers of Argentina
Olympic silver medalists for Argentina
Place of birth missing
Argentine football managers
Estudiantes de La Plata managers
Olympic medalists in football
Copa América-winning players
Medalists at the 1928 Summer Olympics
Association football forwards
Sportspeople from Buenos Aires Province